The Natural Sciences Tripos (NST) is the framework within which most of the science at the University of Cambridge is taught. The tripos includes a wide range of Natural Sciences from physics, astronomy, and geoscience, to chemistry and biology, which are taught alongside the history and philosophy of science. The tripos covers several courses which form the University of Cambridge system of Tripos. It is known for its broad range of study in the first year, in which students cannot study just one discipline, but instead must choose three courses in different areas of the natural sciences and one in mathematics.  As is traditional at Cambridge, the degree awarded after Part II (three years of study) is a Bachelor of Arts (BA). A Master of Natural Sciences degree (MSci)  is available to those who take the optional Part III (one further year). It was started in the 19th Century.

Teaching
Teaching is carried out by 16 different departments. Subjects offered in Part IA in 2019 are Biology of Cells, Chemistry, Computer Science, Evolution and Behaviour, Earth Sciences, Materials Science, Mathematics, Physics, Physiology of Organisms and Mathematical Biology; students must take three experimental subjects and one mathematics course. There are three options for the compulsory mathematics element in IA: "Mathematics A", "Mathematics B" and  "Mathematical Biology". From 2020 Computer Science will no longer be an option in the natural sciences course.

Students specialize further in the second year (Part IB) of their Tripos, taking three subjects from a choice of twenty, and completely in their third year (Part II) in, for example, genetics or astrophysics, although general third year courses do exist – Biomedical and Biological Sciences for biologists and Physical Sciences for chemists, physicists, etc. Fourth year options (Part III) are available in a number of subjects, and usually have an entry requirement of obtaining a 2:1 or a First in second year Tripos Examinations, and is applied for before the commencement of the third year. As of 2008, options with an available Part III option are: Astrophysics; Biochemistry; Chemistry; Earth Sciences; Materials Science and Metallurgy; and Experimental and Theoretical Physics.  the tripos is delivered by sixteen different departments including:
 The Department of Chemistry
 The Department of Chemical Engineering and Biotechnology
 The Department of Genetics
 The Department of Physics
 The Department of Astronomy
 The Department of Biochemistry
 The Department of Pharmacology
 The Department of Plant Sciences
 The Department of Physiology, Development and Neuroscience
 The Department of Zoology
 The Department of Psychology
 The Department of Computer Science and Technology
 The Department of Earth Sciences
 The Department of Materials Science and Metallurgy
 The Department of History and Philosophy of Science

Motivation
The University of Cambridge believes that their course's generalisation, rather than specialisation, gives their students an advantage. First, it allows students to experience subjects at university level before specialising. Second, many modern sciences exist at the boundaries of traditional disciplines, for example, applying methods from a different discipline. Third, this structure allows other scientific subjects, such as Mathematics (traditionally a very strong subject at Cambridge), Medicine and the History and Philosophy of Science, (and previously Computer sciences before it had been removed for 2020 entry) to link with the Natural Sciences Tripos so that once, say, the two-year Part I of the Medical Sciences tripos has been completed, one can specialise in another biological science in Part II during one's third year, and still come out with a science degree specialised enough to move into postgraduate studies, such as a PhD.

Student enrolment
As a result of this structure, the Natural Sciences Tripos has by far the greatest number of students of any Tripos. Undergraduates who are reading for the NST in order to gain their degrees are colloquially known in University slang as 'NatScis (pronounced "Nat-Ski's"), being broadly nicknamed physical science ('phys') or biological science ('bio') NatScis, according to their course choices. (Of course, many students choose both physical and biological options in first year.) The split tends to be about 50:50 between the physical and biological sciences.

In 2018, 2594 students applied and 577 were admitted to the Natural Sciences Tripos.

In order to be accepted to study on the Natural Sciences course, students must sit the NSAA (Natural Science Admissions Assessment) exam in the year of their application. This is a test required by Cambridge to assess their candidates.

References

Academic courses at the University of Cambridge